The 2014 SEC Championship Game was played on Saturday, December 6, 2014, in the Georgia Dome in Atlanta, Georgia, and determined the 2014 football champion of the Southeastern Conference (SEC). The game was played between Western Division Champion Alabama and Eastern Division Champion Missouri. Missouri was the designated home team, and the game was televised by CBS for the fourteenth straight year. In the game, Alabama defeated Missouri 42–13 and captured their 24th SEC football championship.

Notes
The winner of the SEC Championship Game had competed in the last 8 BCS National Championship games, posting a 6–2 record.  This was the inaugural season of the College Football Playoff, replacing the Bowl Championship Series.  The winner of the game, if not selected for the playoff, would normally have played in the Sugar Bowl. However, because that year's Sugar Bowl was to host a national semifinal playoff game, the team would be sent to either the Cotton Bowl, Orange Bowl, Peach Bowl, or the Fiesta Bowl.

Teams

Alabama

The Tide began their season with a 4–0 start before being upset by No. 11 Ole Miss on October 4.  Since then, they won their last seven games, including knocking off No. 1 Mississippi State.  Alabama closed out the regular season with a 55–44 win over No. 15 Auburn to avenge last year's loss, and finished 7–1 in conference play, 11–1 overall.  The Crimson Tide are entering their 9th SEC Championship Game, having won in their last two appearances (and eventually the BCS National Championship Game), and have a 4–4 overall record in the game.  Alabama was able to clinch the Western Division on November 29 prior to the Iron Bowl game kicking off, as Ole Miss defeated Mississippi State in the Egg Bowl to drop Mississippi State to 6–2 in SEC play.

Missouri

The Tigers got off to 4–2 start to open the year, suffering early home losses against Indiana and No. 13 Georgia.  The Tigers then won six consecutive games to finish the regular season with a 7–1 conference record, and 10–2 overall record.  The Tigers are making their second straight appearance in the SEC Championship Game; last year's team fell to eventual national runner-up Auburn 42–59.  The Tigers were able to clinch the Eastern Division after defeating Arkansas on November 28.

Game summary
Alabama scored on the game's opening drive to take a quick 7–0 lead, and a long touchdown pass from quarterback Blake Sims to receiver DeAndrew White early in the second quarter extended the lead to 14–0.  Missouri's offense pieced together a response, but the drive fizzled out and ended in a field goal.  Another Bama touchdown late in the quarter gave the Crimson Tide a 21–3 halftime lead.  Missouri fought their way back into the game in the third quarter, ripping off 10 points to cut the Alabama lead to 8. Unfortunately for the Tigers, they would fail to score for the remainder of the game, as Alabama scored three unanswered touchdowns to secure a 42–13 victory.  The win gave Alabama its 24th SEC Championship, Sims set an SEC Championship Game record for completion percentage, and wide receiver Amari Cooper set both the SEC record for most receptions in a single season and the record for most receptions in the SEC Championship Game.

Source:

Statistics

References

Championship Game
SEC Championship Game
Alabama Crimson Tide football games
Missouri Tigers football games
SEC Championship Game
2014 in Atlanta
SEC Championship Game